{{Infobox award|name=SIIMA Award for Best Male Playback Singer – Telugu|awardname=SIIMA Award for Best Male Playback Singer - Telugu – Telugu|country=India|presenter=Vibri Media Group|producer=Vibri Media Group|awarded_for=Best Singing by a male playback singer in a Telugu song|established=2012|year=2012|holder=Armaan Malik for "Butta Bomma" from Ala Vaikunthapurramuloo|image=Armaan Malik Singer.jpg|image caption=The 2020 recipient – Armaan Malik|most_wins=Sagar – 2Anurag Kulkarni – 2|most_nominations=Shankar Mahadevan – 5|total_recipients=10 (as of 2021)}}

SIIMA Award for Best Male Playback Singer – Telugu is presented by Vibri media group as part of its annual South Indian International Movie Awards, for the best singing by a male playback singer/vocalist of a Telugu-language song. The award was first given in 2012 for songs and films released in 2011.

 Superlatives 

 Winners 

 Nominations 

 2011: Rahul Nambiar – "Guruvaram March" from Dookudu Adnan Sami – "Infatuation" from 100% Love Yuvan Shankar Raja – "Panjaa" from Panjaa Hemachandra – "Prema Desam" from Shakti S. P. Balasubrahmanyam – "Jagadananda Karaka" from Sri Rama Rajyam 2012: S. Thaman – "Sir Osthara" from Businessman
 Adnan Sami – "O Madhu" from Julai Shankar Mahadevan – "Akasam Ammayaithe" from Gabbar Singh S. P. Balasubrahmanyam – "Jaruguthunnaadi" from Krishnam Vande Jagadgurum Hemachandra – "Oka Padam" from Racha 2013: Silambarasan – "Diamond Girl" from Baadshah
 Haricharan – "Padipoya" from DK Bose Anoop Rubens – "Gunde Jaari Gallanthayyinde" from Gunde Jaari Gallanthayyinde Shankar Mahadevan – "Baapu Gaari" from Attarintiki Daredi Daler Mehndi – "Banthi Poola Janaki" from Baadshah 2014: Simha – "Cinema Chupista Maava" from Race Gurram
 Arijit Singh – "Kanulanu Thake" from Manam Master Bharath – "Kanipenchina Maa Ammake" from Manam Devi Sri Prasad – "Who Are You" from 1: Nenokkadine Gold Devaraj – "Bujjimaa" from Run Raja Run 2015: Sagar – "Jatha Kalise" from Srimanthudu Dhananjay & Haricharan – "Bhaje Bhaaje" from Gopala Gopala M. M. Keeravani – "Nippule Shwasaga" from Baahubali: The Beginning Raghu Dixit – "Jaago Jaago Re" from Srimanthudu Sonu Nigam – "Needhe Needhe" from Gopala Gopala 2016: Sagar – "Sailaja Sailaja" from Nenu Sailaja
 Devi Sri Prasad - "Nannaku Prematho" from Nannaku Prematho Shankar Mahadevan – "Pranaamam" from Janatha Garage Sid Sriram – "Vellipomakey" from Sahasam Swasaga Sagipo Vijay Yesudas – "Evare" from Premam 2017: Kaala Bhairava – "Dandaalayya" from Baahubali 2: The Conclusion Armaan Malik – "Hello" from Hello Devi Sri Prasad – "Ammadu Lets Do Kummudu" from Khaidi No. 150 Hemachandra – "Oosupodhu" from Fidaa Sid Sriram – "Adiga Adiga" from Ninnu Kori 2018: Anurag Kulkarni - "Pillaa Raa" from RX 100 Kaala Bhairava – "Peniviti" from Aravinda Sametha Veera Raghava Kailash Kher – "Vochadayyo Saami" from Bharat Ane Nenu Rahul Sipligunj – "Ranga Ranga" from Rangasthalam Sid Sriram – "Inkem Inkem" from Geetha Govindam2019: Anurag Kulkarni – "iSmart Theme" from ISmart Shankar Shankar Mahadevan – "Padara Padara" from Maharshi
 M. L. R. Karthikeyan – "Thandaane Thandaane" from Vinaya Vidheya Rama Sid Sriram – "Aarerey Manasa" from Falaknuma Das Sudharshan Ashok – "Prema Vennala" from Chitralahari
 2020: Armaan Malik – "Butta Bomma" from Ala Vaikunthapurramuloo Shankar Mahadevan – "Sarileru Neekevvaru Anthem" from Sarileru Neekevvaru Kaala Bhairava – "Tharagathi Gadhi" from Colour Photo Pradeep Kumar – "The Life of Ram" from Jaanu
 Raghu Kunche – "Nakkileesu Golusu" from Palasa 1978''

References 

South Indian International Movie Awards
South Indian International Movie Awards winners
Indian music awards